Myki (Mustafčovo) is a municipality in the Xanthi regional unit, Greece. The seat of the municipality is in Sminthi. The majority of the population in the municipality are members of the Turkish Minority.

Municipality
The municipality Myki was formed at the 2011 local government reform by the merger of the following 4 former municipalities, that became municipal units:
Kotyli
Myki
Satres
Thermes

The municipality has an area of 633.334 km2, the municipal unit 314.874 km2. The population of the municipal unit Myki was 12,087 as of 2011. The main villages of the municipal unit are Sminthi, Alma, Glafki, Kentavros, Myki, Echinos, Melivoia and Oraio.

References 

Municipalities of Eastern Macedonia and Thrace
Populated places in Xanthi (regional unit)